Black Alien & Speed was an independent Brazilian Hip hop duo active between 1993 and 2001. Made up of singer Black Alien and the late producer/musician/rapper Speed, they started out using the name Speedfreaks and around 1998 became Black Alien & Speed.

The group performed and recorded in Brazil with artists such as Afrika Bambaataa, De La Soul, Beastie Boys, Chad Smith (Red Hot Chili Peppers), Carlos Lyra, Roberto Menescal, Nação Zumbi, Otto, Marcelo D2 and many others. In 2001, 80.000 copies of the hit "Quem Que Caguetou?"/"Follow Me, Follow Me" were released in a magazine in Brazil, and later in 2003, this song was in a commercial for a Nissan car called "Le Marathon". With the advertisement success, famous DJ Fatboy Slim remixed the track and the remixed version became another hit.

In 2005 the group separated and both members started working on solo careers. Black Alien has recorded a successful solo album, Babylon By Gus, Vol. 1 (2004). Speed released a number of independent albums until his death in 2010.

Brazilian hip hop groups
Musical groups established in 1993
Musical groups disestablished in 2005
1993 establishments in Brazil